Piefke stands for

 a derogatory term used for Germans in Austria.
 Johann Gottfried Piefke, a German conductor

ru:Пифке (значения)